Toisvesi is a medium-sized lake in Finland. It is situated in the municipality of Virrat in the Pirkanmaa region in western Finland. The lake is part of the Kokemäki River basin and a part of a chain of lakes that consist among others of the lakes Ähtärinjärvi, Toisvesi and Tarjanne, which in its turn drains into the Lake Ruovesi. The lake is quite deep by mean depth, and the deepest point is 85 meters under the surface.

See also
List of lakes in Finland

References

Kokemäenjoki basin
Lakes of Virrat